Carmen Pretorius is a South African actress, singer and presenter. She is known for her roles in the films Lien se Lankstaanskoene and Table Manners, for her victory in the reality television show High School Musical: Spotlight South Africa, and for her starring roles in musicals such as The Sound of Music and Chicago.

Early life
Pretorius was born and raised in Johannesburg, South Africa. Her father is an engineer and mother an optometrist. She started singing and performing for her family when she was two years old, and began dancing classes when she was six and singing lessons at the age of eight.

Career
Her first musical was an amateur production when she was fourteen. Not long after, she won gold medals at the South Africa Championship of Performing Arts and subsequently was given the opportunity to perform in the U.S. at age sixteen and in Japan at the age of seventeen. When she was eighteen, during her final year in high school, she won the M-Net reality show High School Musical: Spotlight South Africa in 2008, and as her prize starred as Gabriella in a stage production of High School Musical.

Pretorius was subsequently cast in Footloose and as Sophie in Mamma Mia!, all before she turned twenty, and in the years since appeared in other musicals such as Cabaret and Chicago, and toured for four years in Jersey Boys and The Sound of Music. She has received Naledi Award and Fleur de Cap nominations.

She has also been active in movies and television. She starred as Lien in the film Lien se Lankstaanskoene. She has appeared on television as Tiffany Steyn in Isidingo, and on Binnelanders. She has also been a presenter on Pasella, a lifestyle program, which airs on the SABC 2 channel.

Personal life
As of 25 March 2019, while she was starring as Roxie Hart in Chicago, she was studying for a Bachelor's in Marketing degree from IMM.

Filmography

References

External links
 
 Carmen Pretorius On Landing Her Dream Role In “Chicago”

Living people
Actresses from Johannesburg
South African musical theatre actresses
Year of birth missing (living people)